Conmurra is a locality in the Naracoorte Lucindale Council in the Limestone Coast region of South Australia.

References

Limestone Coast